Maradu  is a fast developing region in the city of Kochi in Kerala, India. It was formed in May 1953 as a Grama Panchayath and was upgraded to the level of municipality in November 2010. National highways NH 85, NH 966 B and NH 66 passes through Maradu and has played a vital role in the development of the area. Maradu is well connected by waterways as well. Maradu is known for the famous "Maradu Vedikkettu" in Maradu Temple.

Demographics 

 India census, Maradu had a population of 40,993. Males constitute 50% of the population and females 50%. Maradu has an average literacy rate of 85%, higher than the national average of 59.5%: male literacy is 87%, and female literacy is 83%. In Maradu, 11% of the population is under 6 years of age.

The famous festival in Maradu is the "Thalappoli Maholsavam", otherwise known as "Maradu Vedikkettu" or "Marattil Kottaram Baghavathy Kshethram."  It is usually in February–March.

It is the biggest "Fire Works" in Ernakulam district. This festival is conducted by 2 committees known as "Vadakke Cheruvaram" (North side of the Temple) and "Thekke Cheruvaram" (South side of the Temple).

Another festival is "kavadiattam" in which people will dance with Kavadi on their head during the last festival day of Sree Subramanya Swami temple, festival comes in the month of January - February
Festival of Lord Siva in the Temples Ayani Siva Kshethra and Pandavathu Siva Kshethra, and festival in Nettoor Juma Masjid Mosque. Nettoor Shiva temple comes under this municipality.
The Famous Festivals in Maradu are The Death Anniversary Celebration of The Saintly Priest Vakayilachan (Fr. George Vakayil) on 4 November of Every Year. Thousands of Devotees Participated in The "Nerchasadya" and Holy Mass and on that day. 'Achan Punyalan' Fr. George Vakayil was declared as Servant of God on 1 September 2013 at St. Mary Magdalene Church Maradu Moothedam by Metropolitan Archbishop Francis Kallarakkal.

Developments 

Three National highways pass through Maradu (NH 66, NH 85, NH 966 B). Presence of the National Highways and its assimilation into Kochi city brought the area under the radar of investors and is now one of the fastest-growing areas in Kochi. Maradu also houses two 5 star hotels, "Le Méridien" & "Crowne Plaza" in addition to several other 2 and 3 start hotels. Maradu is also quite famous for its string of automobile show rooms for Mercedes Benz, Audi, Volvo, Harley-Davidson, BMW, Volkswagen, Honda, Toyota, Chevrolet, Hyundai, Porsche, JLR (Jaguar Cars, Land Rover) and Mitsubishi. Several other high-rise buildings and malls are also coming up alongside the highway stretch. Capital Forum Mall of Prestige Group is under construction on Kochi Bypass near Kannadikadu.

NH 66(kochi bypass/Panavel kochi Kanyakumari highway),NH 85(Kochi Madurai highway) and NH 966 B (Kundanoor Willingdon highway) intersects at Kundannoor Junction. There is also an underpass in Kundanooor. A new 6 lane flyover has also been opened recently at the busy junction.

Since the current Kochi Bypass carries over twice the traffic it is designed to handle, the National Highways Authority of India had come up with a proposal for a new bypass for Kochi city a few years ago. As per the selected alignment, the Kochi New Bypass will begin from NH 544 at Karayamparambu, north of Kochi's suburb Angamaly, and end at NH 66 at Nettoor region of Maradu.

In addition to this new greenfield National Highway project, the existing NH 85 (Kochi-Dhanushkodi) starting from Kundannoor junction will be widened to a four lane one under Bharatmala. As per the plans the new widened NH will avoid the current NH 85 as far as Puthenkurishu, starting around 1 kilometre south of the existing Kundanoor Junction.

Maradu municipality oversees the development and administration of Maradu region. Maradu municipal office is in Kundanoor on KRL road.

Maradu is also a part of the region which comes under the Greater Cochin Development Authority (GCDA).

See also
 Maradu apartments demolition order

References

External links
 Remaining Date for Kothamangalam Municipality Election 2020

Cities and towns in Ernakulam district
Suburbs of Kochi
Neighbourhoods in Kochi